Bicyclus maesseni, or Maessen's ignoble bush brown, is a butterfly in the family Nymphalidae. It is found in eastern Ivory Coast, Ghana and Togo. The habitat consists of primary and secondary forests with a closed canopy, usually with tangled undergrowth.

References

Elymniini
Butterflies described in 1971